Marcello Agnoletto (born 2 January 1932) is a retired professional Italian footballer who played as a midfielder.

Club career
Agnoletto played for 6 seasons (118 games, 6 goals) in the Italian Serie A for Calcio Padova, U.C. Sampdoria and L.R. Vicenza.

International career
Agnoletto played his only game for the Italy national football team on 11 November 1956, appearing in a match against Switzerland.

External links
 

1932 births
Living people
Italian footballers
Italy international footballers
Serie A players
Calcio Padova players
U.C. Sampdoria players
L.R. Vicenza players
Modena F.C. players
Treviso F.B.C. 1993 players
S.S.D. Lucchese 1905 players
Calcio Montebelluna players
Association football midfielders